I år är julen min is a Christmas album by Tommy Nilsson, released on 3 November 2010.

Track listing
Nu tändas tusen juleljus (Emmy Köhler)
I år är julen min (Tommy Nilsson)
Välkommen hem (Tommy Nilsson)
När det lider mot jul (Ruben Liljefors, Jeanna Oterdahl)
Tomtarnas julnatt (Wilhelm Sefve-Svensson, Alfred Smedberg)
Knalle juls vals (Evert Taube)
Låt mig få tända ett ljus (Schlaf, mein Prinzchen, schlaf ein) (Bernhard Flies, Börje Carlsson)
Jul, jul, strålande jul (Gustav Nordqvist, Edvard Evers)
Silver på mitt fönster (Paul Buchanan, Ulf Schagerström)
Stilla natt (Stille Nacht, heilige Nacht), with Henning Kvitnes (Franz Gruber, Oscar Mannström, Edvard Evers, Torsten Fogelkvist)
Julen är just i natt (Robbie Robertson, Ulf Schagerström)
Betlehems stjärna (Alice Tegnér, Viktor Rydberg)
Januari skrattar (Lasse Englund, Marie Bergman)
Ring den nya tiden in (Tommy Nilsson)

Contributors
Tommy Nilsson - singer
Lasse Englund - guitar, mandolin, banjo, dobro, producer
Björn Lundquist - bass
Kjell Gustafsson - drums, percussion
Sven Gunnar Pettersson - piano
Rikard Nilsson - organ
Joakim Milder - recorder
Stockholm Strings - musicians

References 

2010 Christmas albums
Christmas albums by Swedish artists
Tommy Nilsson albums